TLC Arabia is a regional branch channel of the TLC network broadcasting in the Middle East and North Africa (MENA) region. The channel was launched on 24 March 2014.

Original programming
 Nida'a (or The Calling) – a women-focused talk show hosted by Zainab Salbi
 My World to You º a travel show hosted by Darine Al Khatib

References

External links

Arab World